Tepikinskaya is a rural locality (a stanitsa) in Akchernskoye Rural Settlement, Uryupinsky District, Volgograd Oblast, Russia. The population was 403 as of 2010. There are 10 streets.

Geography 
Tepikinskaya is located on the left bank of the Khopyor River, 26 km southwest of Uryupinsk (the district's administrative centre) by road. Belogorsky is the nearest rural locality.

References 

Rural localities in Uryupinsky District